The  is an agency of the Japanese government established on February 10, 2012 to coordinate reconstruction activities related to the 2011 Tōhoku earthquake and tsunami and Fukushima Daiichi nuclear disaster.

Mission

According to "Role of the Reconstruction Agency", the agency will: 1. Plan, coordinate, and implement the national policy on reconstruction;2. Bear the responsibility for a unified point of contact, assistance, etc. to local public bodies.

History and function

The Reconstruction Agency was established to replace the Reconstruction Headquarters in response to the Great East Japan earthquake, created on June 24, 2011. The Reconstruction Agency was headed by the Prime Minister Yoshihiko Noda. Noda was named direct head of the agency in an effort to strengthen the leadership of the organization. Tatsuo Hirano, a native of Iwate Prefecture, served as the agency's first Minister of State for Disaster Management until he was replaced by Osamu Fujimura on June 4, 2012. The Reconstruction Agency is not part of the Cabinet Office, but will have authority over other government ministries. The agency will exist for ten years, the length of time estimated to fully restore the region after the disaster, and be dissolved on March 3, 2021. A wooden tablet for the new agency was made from materials from the earthquake zone. Prime Minister Noda placed the tablet at the Akasaka Agency headquarters as a reminder of the responsibility to residents of the disaster-hit regions.

The Reconstruction Agency established three Regional Offices for Reconstruction in Iwate, Miyagi, and Fukushima prefectures, and two smaller regional offices in Hachinohe, Aomori Prefecture and Mito, Ibaraki Prefecture. The agency also sought to work with business associations in Japan in order to establish or revive economic activity in the Tohoku region affected by the earthquake, tsunami, and nuclear disaster. The agency, as well as the Japan Business Federation, the Japan Association of Corporate Executives, the Japan Chamber of Commerce and Industry, and their affiliated corporations, formed the Reconstruction Design Council in response to the Great East Japan earthquake.

Timeline
2011
March 11 — Tōhoku earthquake and tsunami
June 24 —  (Law No. 76 of 2011) passed in the Diet of Japan
June 24 — Reconstruction Headquarters in response to the Great East Japan earthquake created
September 2 — Resignation of Prime Minister Naoto Kan, Prime Minister Yoshihiko Noda assumes office
December 9 —  (Law No. 125 of 2011) passed in the Diet of Japan
2012
February 10 — Opening of Reconstruction Agency
June 4 — Osamu Fujimura became the agency's second Minister of State for Disaster Management

Structure

 (Minato-ku, Tokyo)
 (Morioka, Iwate Prefecture)
 (Miyako, Iwate Prefecture)
 (Kamaishi, Iwate Prefecture)
 (Sendai, Miyagi Prefecture)
 (Kesennuma, Miyagi Prefecture)
 (Ishinomaki, Miyagi Prefecture)
 (Fukushima, Fukushima Prefecture)
 (Minamisōma, Fukushima Prefecture)
 (Iwaki, Fukushima Prefecture)
 (Hachinohe, Aomori Prefecture)
 (Mito, Ibaraki Prefecture)

Criticism

The establishment of the Reconstruction Agency received criticism for both the slow pace of its establishment, and for the location of its headquarters. Residents and officials in regions affected by the disaster, notably Yūhei Satō, governor of Fukushima Prefecture, publicly noted the lack of speed in which the agency was created:

Legislation in the National Diet to establish the agency was slowed by the resignation of Prime Minister Naoto Kan in September 2011. The bill to create the agency passed in December 2011, nine months after the disaster occurred, delaying the opening of the agency until February 2012. Kan acknowledged the slow pace of government response to the disaster on March 3, 2011, and pledged to speed up recovery efforts. Residents displaced by the tsunami have opposed Agency-led plans to rebuild towns on higher land away from the coast, and see it as a disconnect between the central government and the population in the Tōhoku region. After a strict review of initial projects, the Agency approved a large number of projects in a second round of reviews in May 2012, including funds for urban and agricultural renewal.

Ministers 
 Tatsuo Hirano (1st: February 10, 2012 - December 26, 2012)
 Takumi Nemoto (2nd: December 26, 2012 - September 3, 2014)
 Wataru Takeshita (3rd: September 3, 2014 - October 7, 2015)
 Tsuyoshi Takagi (4th: October 7, 2015 - August 3, 2016)
 Masahiro Imamura (5th: August 3, 2016 - April 26, 2017)
 Masayoshi Yoshino (6th: April 26, 2017 - October 2, 2018)
 Hiromichi Watanabe (7th: October 2, 2018 - September 11, 2019)
 Kazunori Tanaka (8th: September 11, 2019 - September 16, 2020)
 Katsuei Hirasawa (9th: September 16, 2020 - October 4, 2021)
 Kosaburo Nishime (10th: October 4, 2021 - )
 Kenya Akiba (11th)
 TBD (12th)

Deputy Ministers 

 Hiroyuki Togashi (2022)
 Hideki Niizuma (2022)
 Takeyuki Watanabe (2022)

See also 
2011 Tōhoku earthquake and tsunami
Fukushima Daiichi nuclear disaster
Prime Minister of Japan
Naoto Kan
Yoshihiko Noda
Tatsuo Hirano

References

External links

Official sites

Publications

2012 establishments in Japan
Ministries established in 2012
Government ministries of Japan
Government agencies of Japan
Cabinet Office (Japan)
2011 Tōhoku earthquake and tsunami